The Cambridge Singers is an English mixed voice chamber choir formed in 1981 by their director John Rutter with the primary purpose of making recordings under their own label Collegium Records.  

The group initially comprised former singers from the Choir of Clare College, Cambridge, where Rutter had previously been the music director.

They have been involved in the last four Fresh Aire albums (about "mankind's curiosities") of the Mannheim Steamroller band, by composer Chip Davis, but they are primarily a classical choral group.

They have recorded several highly acclaimed Christmas albums, including Christmas Day in the Morning, Christmas Night: Carols of the Nativity, Christmas Star, Christmas with the Cambridge Singers, and The Cambridge Singers Christmas Album.

List of albums  

 Gloria (1983 and 2005) with Philip Jones Brass Ensemble and City of London Sinfonia  
 Fauré: Requiem and other sacred music (1984, 1988 and 2010)
 Hurry to Bethlehem: The Christmas Music of John Rutter (1985) with City of London Sinfonia
 There Is Sweet Music (1986, 2002)
 Christmas Night (1987) with City of London Sinfonia
 Flora gave me fairest flowers (1987, 2003)
 Faire is the Heaven (1988)
 Poulenc Sacred Music (1988, 2002) with City of London Sinfonia
 Treasures of English Church Music (1988)
 Ave Verum Corpus (1989, 2002)
 Christmas with the Cambridge Singers (1989) with City of London Sinfonia
 Hail! Gladdening Light (1991)
 Rutter Magnificat (1991, 2017) with City of London Sinfonia
 Fancies (1992, 2005)
 Three Musical Fables (1992, 2003) with The King's Singers and City of London Sinfonia
 Rutter Requiem and Magnificat (1998) 
 Hail! Queen of Heaven (2002), formerly Ave Gracia Plena (1992)
 Cambridge Singers A Cappella (1993, 2002)
 Images of Christ (1995)
 Stillness and Sweet Harmony (1996)
 Christmas Star (1997)
 Sing, Ye Heavens (2000) with City of London Sinfonia
 Feel the Spirit (2001, 2013) with the BBC Concert Orchestra and Melanie Marshall (mezzo soprano)
 The John Rutter Christmas Album (2002)
 Mass of the Children (2003) with Cantate Youth Choir, City of London Sinfonia, Joanne Lunn (soprano) and Roderick Williams (baritone)
 The Cambridge Singers Christmas Album (2003) with City of London Sinfonia
 Be thou my Vision (2004) with City of London Sinfonia
 The Sprig of Thyme (2005) with City of London Sinfonia, formerly The Lark in the Clear Air (1993)
 Lighten Our Darkness (2006) with the Royal Philharmonic Orchestra, recorded in the Lady Chapel of Ely Cathedral
 Handel: Messiah (Highlights) (2007) with the Royal Philharmonic Orchestra
 Handel: Messiah (2007) with the Royal Philharmonic Orchestra
 A Christmas Festival (2008), with the Royal Philharmonic Orchestra and Farnham Youth Choir
 The Sacred Flame (2009) with La Nuova Musica
 A Song in Season (2010) with the Royal Philharmonic Orchestra
 This is the Day (2012) with Aurora Orchestra
 Sea Change (2013): the choral music of Richard Rodney Bennett
 O Praise the Lord of Heaven (2013)
 A Double Celebration (2014) with City of London Sinfonia
 The Gift of Life (2015) with the Royal Philharmonic Orchestra
 Visions and Requiem (2016) with Choristers of the Temple Church, Aurora Orchestra and Kerson Leong (violin)
 Stanford and Howells Remembered (2020), formerly I will lift up mine eyes (1992): music by Charles Stanford and Herbert Howells
 A Banquet of Voices (1994, and re-released in September 2020)
 I Sing of a Maiden (2021)

References

External links
John Rutter website
Singers.com's listing of Cambridge Singers albums, with reviews

Cambridge choirs
Musical groups established in 1981
1981 establishments in England